Kurthia senegalensis is an aerobic bacterium from the genus of Kurthia which has been isolated from human feces from Dielmo in Senegal.

References

Bacillota
Bacteria described in 2016